Eileen Marie Davidson (born 15 June 1959) is an American actress, author, television personality and former model. Davidson is best known for her roles in soap operas as Kristen DiMera and Susan Banks on NBC's Days of Our Lives and Ashley Abbott on CBS's The Young and the Restless and The Bold and the Beautiful.

In 2014, Davidson was awarded a Daytime Emmy Award for Outstanding Lead Actress in a Drama Series for her role in Days of Our Lives. She was the second actress to win a Daytime Emmy Award in the category of "Lead Actress" for the soap; and in 2018 she won the award again for her role on The Young and the Restless.
 
Davidson also starred in the film The House on Sorority Row (1983), had a leading role in the short-lived CBS crime series Broken Badges (1990–91), and wrote a number of mystery novels in the 2000s. In 2014, Davidson joined the cast of Bravo reality television series The Real Housewives of Beverly Hills, appearing full-time on the program until 2017.

Early life
Davidson, the youngest of seven children, was born in Artesia, California to Charlotte (
Burkhard) Davidson, a homemaker, and Richard Davidson, an airplane parts manufacturer. She was raised Roman Catholic. She attended St. Paul High School in Santa Fe Springs, California.

Davidson started her career as a model in Mexico City and California, eventually adding commercials and print work in Europe. Her roommate had recommended that she take acting classes and she trained at the Staircase Theater.

Career

Early work
Davidson originated the role of Ashley Abbott on The Young and the Restless in March 1982, beating out more than 100 candidates. The character of Ashley became a front-burner character, and Davidson became an integral part of the show. She quit the show in December 1988 and the producers took her recommendation of hiring a look-alike actress named Brenda Epperson, whom Davidson had discovered waiting tables at a charity function. Davidson also appeared in several films during the 1980s, including a main role in the slasher film The House on Sorority Row (1983) and Easy Wheels (1989), opposite Ted Raimi.

Davidson then appeared in primetime television, but her show, Broken Badges (1990–1991), was canceled. She returned to daytime when she assumed the role of Kelly Capwell on Santa Barbara from November 1991 until the soap's cancelation in January 1993. She next appeared as Kristen Blake on Days of Our Lives beginning in May 1993. As originally conceived, Kristen was a heroine, who had an Achilles' heel in that the show's supervillain, Stefano, had raised her after the death of her parents. James E. Reilly, who assumed head writing reins in 1993, began to make Kristen more of a villainess. Reilly eventually developed an outrageous second role for Davidson, having her play Susan Banks, a Kristen look-alike. Reilly eventually penned three more roles for Davidson (Sister Mary Moira, Thomas, and Penelope). Her character, Kristen, intended to keep her other character, Susan, prisoner on an island, but Susan ultimately prevailed and Kristen remained on the island until she returned to Salem in 2012. All other related characters were last seen in May 1998. Davidson's five roles earned her a Daytime Emmy nomination for Outstanding Lead Actress in 1998.

After a year-long vacation from acting, she returned to her role on The Young and the Restless in March 1999. After a successful return as Ashley Abbott, which included Davidson's second Daytime Emmy nomination for Outstanding Lead Actress, Davidson was fired from the show. In December 2006, Davidson told TV Guide that she was fired from The Young and the Restless due to lack of storyline. Her last airdate as Ashley was January 11, 2007. According to co-star Melody Thomas Scott, the firing was protested behind the scenes of The Young and the Restless and was seen as unfair. Scott said: "That was so heartbreaking. We're still upset about that. That was a blow. Terrible. Eileen Davidson was such a part of the core of the show and such a brilliant actress; beautiful and always prepared. It was crazy. I'm not the only one who feels that way." In a surprise move a few months later, Davidson signed a three-year contract with The Young and the Restless'''s sister soap The Bold and the Beautiful to once again play her The Young and the Restless character Ashley Abbott at the request of The Bold and the Beautiful executive producer Bradley Bell. She first aired on March 9, 2007. Ken Corday called Davidson about a week before she was fired from The Young and the Restless to get permission to use a picture of her on Days of Our Lives. The picture, which featured Davidson as Susan, was shown in December 2006.
After she was fired from The Young and the Restless but before being cast in The Bold and the Beautiful, her niece Devon Martt, a fashion designer, approached her about designing clothes together.

Writing and acting
Davidson co-wrote her first novel with author Robert J. Randisi, a mystery set in the soap opera world titled Death in Daytime, released in October 2008.  She followed it up with three sequels: Dial Emmy for Murder (2009), Diva Las Vegas (2010), and Swinging in the Rain (2011).

In July 2008, Eileen was downgraded to recurring status at The Bold and the Beautiful. She returned to The Young and the Restless full-time as Ashley on September 26, 2008. In 2012, Nelson Branco announced that Sony Pictures Entertainment wanted Davidson on both The Young and the Restless and Days of Our Lives, but that Y&R would not share the actress, leading Sony to terminate her contract with them. Thus, it was announced that Davidson would reprise her role as Kristen Blake DiMera on Days of Our Lives.Davidson made a brief appearance on The Young and the Restless in February 2013 for the soap's 40th anniversary. In July 2013, it was announced that Davidson made the decision to leave Days of Our Lives after a year as Kristen. Davidson exited the role on-screen on November 13, 2013. In late November, it was confirmed that Davidson would return for an episode scheduled to air on December 3, 2013.

On January 28, 2014, it was announced that Davidson would return to the role of Kristen in the summer of 2014. On May 1, 2014, it was formally announced that Davidson was nominated for a Daytime Emmy Award in the category of Outstanding Lead Actress In A Drama Series for Days of Our Lives. It's her third Daytime Emmy Award nomination, her second for Days. She won the award on June 22, 2014.

On June 17, 2014, it was announced that Davidson had signed a contract to return to The Young and the Restless. Subsequently, Davidson revealed that her Y&R contract was for two years and that it included a stipulation that she could continue doing Days of Our Lives in the future, as well as having the option of taking a break if work became too hectic. Davidson also joined the cast of the fifth season of Bravo reality television series, The Real Housewives of Beverly Hills. On November 17, 2014, it was announced that Davidson was back on-set of Days of Our Lives, with a stint set to air in spring 2015. She appeared from April 15–30, 2015. On June 12, 2017, it was announced that Davidson would return to Days of Our Lives. Davidson returned from November 2–21 as Susan. Davidson also briefly reprised the roles of Kristen and Sister Mary Moira on November 21 of that year.  Davidson stated in 2019 that she had been offered a role on All My Children earlier on in her career, but had turned it down as she could not afford to move to New York with her five dogs. She was cast in the Christmas film Middleton Christmas (2020) as Alana D'Angelo, the dean of a prestigious high school.

Personal life
Davidson has been married three times, her first being to actor Christopher Mayer from 1985 to 1986. Her second husband was General Hospital, Port Charles  and As the World Turns actor Jon Lindstrom, to whom she was married from 1997 to 2000. Mayer and Lindstrom were both stars of the TV series Santa Barbara, a show on which Davidson also spent two years, although they did not appear on the show at the same time. Since 2003, Davidson has been married to actor, former tennis professional and World Poker Tour commentator Vincent Van Patten. They have a son. The pair met in 2000, when Van Patten briefly appeared as Christian, her character's boyfriend during a cruise, on The Young and the Restless''.

Filmography

Bibliography
Davidson collaborated with Robert J. Randisi on all the novels listed.

Awards and nominations

References

External links
Eileen Davidson's official website

Living people
American film actresses
American soap opera actresses
American television actresses
Actresses from Los Angeles
Daytime Emmy Award winners
Daytime Emmy Award for Outstanding Lead Actress in a Drama Series winners
The Real Housewives cast members
People from Artesia, California
20th-century American actresses
21st-century American actresses
Van Patten family
Year of birth missing (living people)